Hans Clausen (born 2 July 1971) is a Danish international motorcycle speedway rider who rode in 2001 Speedway Grand Prix of Denmark and 2001 Speedway World Cup. Clausen won Individual Speedway Danish Championship in 2001.
Since 2006 Hans Clausen is the team manager and chief mechanic of Danish Renault Clio Cup team, DanAgro Racing.

Speedway Grand Prix results

See also 
 Denmark national speedway team
 List of Speedway Grand Prix riders

References 

1971 births
Living people
Danish speedway riders